The Amateur Athletic Union (AAU) is an amateur sports organization based in the United States. A multi-sport organization, the AAU is dedicated exclusively to the promotion and development of amateur sports and physical fitness programs. It has more than 700,000 members nationwide, including more than 100,000 volunteers. The philosophy of the AAU is "Sports for All, Forever."

The AAU was founded on January 21, 1888, by James E. Sullivan and William Buckingham Curtis with the goal of creating common standards in amateur sport.  Since then, most national championships for youth athletes in the United States have taken place under AAU leadership. From its founding as a publicly supported organization, the AAU has represented U.S. sports within the various international sports federations.  In the late 1800s to the early 1900s, Spalding Athletic Library of the Spaulding Company published the Official Rules of the AAU.

The AAU formerly worked closely with what is now today the United States Olympic & Paralympic Committee to prepare U.S. athletes for both the Summer and Winter Olympic Games, helping in the qualification of athletes to form the national team. As part of this, the AAU Junior Olympic Games were introduced in 1949, with athletes aged 8 to 16 years, or older in certain sports, being able to participate. Many future World and Olympic champions have appeared in these events, which are still held every year.

In the 1970s, the AAU received growing criticism. Many claimed that its regulatory framework was outdated. Women were banned from participating in certain competitions and some runners were locked out.  There were also problems with sporting goods that did not meet the standards of the AAU. During this time, the Olympic Sports Act of 1978 organized the then United States Olympic Committee and saw the re-establishment of independent associations for the Olympic sports, referred to as national governing bodies.  The rise of professionalism in all sports in the latter half of the 20th century also hurt the AAU's viability. As a result, the AAU lost its influence and importance in international sports, and focused on the support and promotion of predominantly youthful athletes, as well as on the organization of national sports events.

History
Prior to AAU, the National Association of Amateur Athletes of America (NAAA) existed from 1879 to 1888.  The AAU was co-founded in 1888 by William Buckingham Curtis to establish standards and uniformity in amateur sports.  During its early years the AAU served as a leader in international sport representing the United States in the international sports federations. The AAU worked closely with the Olympic movement to prepare athletes for the Olympic Games.

After the Amateur Sports Act of 1978 broke up the AAU's responsibility as the national Olympic sports governing body, the AAU focused on providing sports programs for all participants of all ages beginning at the local and regional levels.

The AAU conducted its first event, championships for boxing, fencing and wrestling, on April 6, 1888 at New York’s Metropolitan Opera House. 

In 1897, the AAU held its first National Men’s Basketball Championship. The winner was the 23rd Street YMCA from New York City. 

The first AAU Women’s Basketball Tournament was held in April 1926 at the Los Angeles Athletics Club. The Pasadena Athletic & Country Club Flying Rings were crowned the champions.

The open USA Outdoor Track and Field Championships were organized by the AAU between 1888 and 1978.  In 1923 the AAU sponsored the First American Track & Field championships for women. The AAU is divided into 56 distinct district associations, which annually sanction 34 sports programs, 250 national championships, and over 30,000 age division events.  The AAU events have over 500,000 participants and over 50,000 volunteers.

Women barred
Starting in 1914, the Amateur Athletic Union barred women athletes from competing in events that it sponsored.  In 1914 they changed their rules and allowed women to compete in a limited number of swimming events. Just two years later in 1916, AAU was considering discontinuing their experiment in allowing women at swimming events.

In 1922, the Metropolitan AAU in New York City approved a larger program of sanctioned  events for women but still barred them from running events over one-half mile because they were considered too strenuous. The reason given for barring women was that if a woman was allowed to run more than a half-mile they would put their reproductive health at risk. But by 1923 the AAU allowed women to compete in most sports, including basketball. The AAU held women's basketball tournaments from 1926 through 1970.

In 1961, the Amateur Athletic Union still prohibited women from competing in road running events and even if organizers broke the rule and allowed a woman to participate, her results would not be counted in the official race results. In 1970, the first New York City Marathon ignored the AAU rules and allowed women in the event even if it meant that their scores would not be official. For the second New York City Marathon in 1971 the AAU allowed women to participate if they started the race 10 minutes before, or 10 minutes after the men, or if they ran a separate but equal course. By 1974 women were becoming more vocal about their restrictions.

Ice hockey breaks away
Prior to 1936, ice hockey in North America was governed by the AAU and the Amateur Athletic Union of Canada. After the Canadian Amateur Hockey Association (CAHA) split ways with its national union, the AAU terminated its working agreement with the CAHA which had allowed for transferring of players and exhibition games between the two countries. The AAU then issued an ultimatum to the Eastern Amateur Hockey League (EAHL) in August 1937, not to have any Canadian-born players in its league. EAHL president Tommy Lockhart chose to break away from the AAU and reached an agreement with the CAHA, then founded the Amateur Hockey Association of the United States (AHAUS) to govern ice hockey. The AHAUS and the CAHA joined to form the International Ice Hockey Association, which merged into the Ligue Internationale de Hockey sur Glace to become the International Ice Hockey Federation (IIHF) in 1947. With the merger, the IIHF chose to recognize the AHAUS as the governing body of hockey in the United States, instead of the AAU.

Despite the decision by the IIHF, the AAU sent its own team to compete in ice hockey at the 1948 Winter Olympics. The AAU was supported by the United States Olympic Committee led by Avery Brundage, who threatened a United States boycott the Olympics if an AHAUS team was recognized instead of an AAU team. The status of ice hockey at the 1948 Winter Olympics was not resolved until the night before the Olympics began, after bitter negotiations. The International Olympic Committee allowed the AHAUS team to participate, but they were ineligible to win an Olympic medal.

Break-up
The Amateur Sports Act of 1978 was precipitated by grumblings of the inefficiency of the AAU to manage the multitude of sports at the Olympic level.  USA Gymnastics was formed initially as a feeder program in 1963 as a response to perceived poor performance by the American performers in the Olympics and at World Championships.  The USWF was formed in 1968 as an effort to take over amateur wrestling as an independent governing body.  Their position was supported when FILA, then wrestling's world governing body, refused to accept membership of "umbrella" sports organizations like the AAU. The International Track Association was formed immediately after the 1972 Olympics. Prior to the formation of the ITA, track and field athletes were amateur athletes, as required by the Olympic creed of the day.  The only income they received from their sport was "under the table."  As a result, many American athletes' careers were frequently cut short shortly after their subsidized participation at the collegiate level ended, while Eastern Bloc and other international athletes frequently had their careers extended, subsidized ostensibly by participation in the Army or police forces.  Pressure from the athletes had been mounting for years to find an answer.  Track and Field News discussed the subject with its cover article "Take the Money and Run" in November 1971.

Headquarters 

 
AAU got its start in New York City. But in 1957, the search began for a permanent national office site rather than renting office space in NYC. In 1970, the AAU officially moved its national headquarters to Indianapolis, serving as the catalyst which eventually bills the city as the “Amateur Sports Capital” of the United States. In 1994, the AAU joined forces with the Walt Disney World Resort, signing a 30-year agreement.  As part of that agreement, many of AAU's national championships in many sports are played at the ESPN Wide World of Sports Complex in Lake Buena Vista. In 1996, the AAU relocated its national headquarters to Walt Disney World in Lake Buena Vista, Florida. More than 40 AAU national events are conducted at the complex. The AAU headquarters is located within the former Walt Disney World Preview Center.

Programs
Programs offered by the AAU include: AAU Sports Program, AAU Junior Olympic Games, AAU James E. Sullivan Memorial Award and the AAU Complete Athlete Program. 

In addition, the President's Challenge program is administered on behalf of the President's Council on Physical Fitness and Sports. The AAU has 33 national committees to organize its activities in particular sports.
 
AAU operates under a 501(c)(3) tax-exempt status granted in 1996.

Sports offered
The Amateur Athletic Union offers participants sport programming in individual and team sports in their local community that they can join and compete with other athletes their own age.  There are teams in most sports ranging from 9U to 18U, allowing youth athletes to play for championships in sports against other athletes similar in age and athletic development.

The AAU offers sport programming for individuals and teams in the following sports:

 AAU Junior Olympic Games
 Aerobics
 Athletics
 Badminton
 Baseball
 Basketball
 Baton twirling
 Beach volleyball
 Bowling
 Cheerleading
 Dance
 Football
 Futsal
 Flag football
 Freestyle judo
 Golf
 Gymnastics
 Ice hockey
 Jump rope
 Karate
 Lacrosse
 Olympic weightlifting
 Pickleball
 Powerlifting
 Soccer
 Softball
 Surfing
 Swimming and Diving
 Table tennis
 Taekwondo
 Track and field
 Trampoline and Tumbling
 Volleyball
 Water polo
 Wrestling

AAU Junior Olympic Games 
The AAU Junior Olympic Games is the largest multi-sport event for youth in the United States. It has become the showcase event of the AAU Sports Program. 

The Games originated from ‘telegraphic' state track and field competitions. National Champions were determined through telephone and/or mail entries instead of head-to-head competition. In 1949, the AAU conducted its first ‘live' national meet in Cleveland, Ohio — giving birth to the AAU Youth Sports Program. 

As the popularity of the AAU Youth Sports Program increased, the AAU leaders decided to conduct two national championships simultaneously. The idea came to fruition when Vice President Hubert H. Humphrey proclaimed the first AAU Junior Olympic Games open on August 21, 1967 in downtown Washington, D.C at the Departmental Auditorium on Constitution Avenue. Five hundred twenty-three athletes competed in the inaugural AAU Junior Olympic Games in Washington, D.C. in 1967. National champions were determined in swimming and track and field. Eighteen AAU records in swimming and three in track and field were established. 

Since its beginning in Washington, D.C., the AAU Junior Olympic Games have been conducted in 19 states and 31 cities across the United States. The Games popularity has exploded from the original 523 athletes to more than 18,000 participants representing all 50 states and several United States territories. 

The AAU Junior Olympic Games has been honored with Champions of Economic Impact in Sports Tourism Awards from Sports Destination Management in 2017, 2018, 2019, 2021, and 2022.

AAU Junior National Volleyball Championships 
The AAU Junior National Volleyball Championships is one of AAU’s premier and award-winning national events. The inaugural AAU Junior National Volleyball Championships took place on June 25, 1974 in Catonsville, Maryland. Nineteen teams participated, representing 10 states.

In June 1997, the AAU Junior National Volleyball Championships was held at Disney’s Wide World of Sports Complex (now ESPN Wide World of Sports) for the first time. It was the first volleyball event to be played in the Fieldhouse at the complex, with a total of 127 teams attending.

In 2012, the AAU Girls’ Junior National Volleyball Championships was named the largest volleyball tournament in the world by Guinness World Records. The event was held at ESPN’s Wide World of Sports and the Orange County Convention Center in Orlando, Florida.

The 49th AAU Junior National Volleyball Championships in 2022 was the largest event to date with 4,450 teams (678 boys and 3772 girls) participating in 56 divisions. It’s the largest sporting event ever held at the Orange County Convention Center.

Over the years, this premier AAU event has been recognized as a six-time winner of the Champions of Economic Impact in Sports Tourism Award by Sports Destination Management, Best Single Amateur Sporting Event by Sports Travel Awards, and Best Sporting Event by Connect Sports.

AAU Cares
The AAU Cares program was established in 2016 as the AAU's way of giving back to the community. The first event was held in conjunction with the 86th AAU James E. Sullivan Award. With the assistance of New York State Senator Kevin Parker, bicycles were assembled by the AAU Board of Directors and presented to under-served New York City area youth. Other AAU Cares events were held in conjunction with the AAU Girls' Junior National Volleyball Championships in 2016 and 2017 respectively where the AAU teamed up with Feeding Children Everywhere to pack a total of 120,000 meals in total for hungry children.

AAU Urban Initiative 
The AAU Urban Initiative was created in 2015 to provide a holistic approach to athletics. It provides participation opportunities to areas that were historically under served. The initiative partners the AAU with local government, law enforcement, faith-based groups, business communities, educational institutions and other groups who work to bring communities together through sports in service to America’s youth. Through mentoring, the program teaches life skills, character development, and harmony.

United Hockey Union
The United Hockey Union (UHU) is a group of junior ice hockey leagues and the NCHA college club league based in North America. The UHU is overseen and insured by the Amateur Athletic Union and was founded in 2012. Neither body is recognized by USA Hockey, Hockey Canada, or the International Ice Hockey Federation.

AAU Hockey sponsors national tournaments for minor hockey levels. A North American Championship for Squirt/Atom and PeeWee levels as well as Midget and Bantam levels is set for debut in 2015 in cooperation with the Canadian Independent Hockey Federation (CIHF).

AAU James E. Sullivan Award 
The AAU James E. Sullivan Award has been presented annually since 1930 to the best collegiate or Olympic-level athlete in the United States – making this award older than The Heisman (1935). 

The AAU Sullivan Award is a salute to founder and past president of the Amateur Athletic Union, and a pioneer in amateur sports, James E. Sullivan. Based on the qualities of leadership, character, and sportsmanship, the AAU Sullivan Award goes beyond athletic accomplishments and honors those who have shown strong moral character as well.

Golfer Bobby Jones was the first recipient of the AAU Sullivan Award in 1930, beating out other finalists Barney Berling (athletics), Clarence De Mar (athletics), Tommy Hitchcock (polo), Helen Madison (swimming), Helen Wills Moody (tennis), Harlon Rothert (all-around), Ray Rudy (swimming), George Simpson (athletics) and Stella Walsh (athletics) to take home the honor.

In 1944, Ann Curtis, an 18-year-old swimmer from San Francisco, became the first woman to receive the AAU Sullivan Award. Curtis had captured eight AAU titles during the year.

In 2022, the 92nd AAU James E. Sullivan Award was presented to Olympic gold medalist Carissa Moore, who became the first surfer and first Hawaiian native to win the prestigious award. Other finalists included Jocelyn Alo (softball), Jordan Burroughs (wrestling), Ivan Melendez (baseball), and Bryce Young (football).

Masters Track and Field
Masters Track and Field officially began in 1968, and in 1971 became a separate group within the AAU organization.  Masters Track and Field is now part of USA Track & Field (USATF).

Documentary films
The live action short film The Winning Strain was filmed at the 1966 AAU Track and Field championships in New York City and was nominated for an Oscar in 1967.

1999 HBO documentary Dare to Compete: The Struggle of Women in Sports won the Peabody Award.

In September 2008, More than a Game premiered at the Toronto International Film Festival. LeBron James founded SpringHill Entertainment in 2007 to produce the award-winning documentary, which chronicles his high school basketball career.

The 2011 documentary Empty Hand: The Real Karate Kids, written and directed by Kevin Derek, chronicles four young karate competitors compete en route to the annual AAU Karate Championship national tournament.

A 2013 AAU youth basketball documentary Little Ballers, was televised by Nickelodeon in 2015, as the first documentary to be aired on NickSports. The film was directed by Crystal McCrary and featured AAU youth team New Heights, featuring Cole Anthony, who is her son.

In 2016, At All Costs explores how the AAU basketball circuit has professionalized youth basketball across America.

Criticism
In the early 1970s, the AAU became the subject of criticism, notably by outspoken track star Steve Prefontaine, over the living conditions for amateur athletes under the AAU, as well as rules that were perceived to be arbitrary. 

The AAU ceased to have any governance over Olympic sports in the U.S. when, due to various criticisms, Congress intervened. A three-year commission led to its enactment of the Amateur Sports Act of 1978, establishing the United States Olympic Committee (USOPC) and national governing bodies for each Olympic sport. The AAU continues as a voluntary organization which mainly promotes youth sports.

In 2015, Kobe Bryant strongly criticized the AAU, describing it as "Horrible, terrible AAU basketball. It's stupid. It doesn't teach our kids how to play the game at all so you wind up having players that are big and they bring it up and they do all this fancy crap and they don't know how to post. They don't know the fundamentals of the game. It's stupid". Bryant, who moved to Italy at age six because of his father playing basketball there, stated that the AAU has been "treating (amateur basketball players) like cash cows for everyone to profit off of". Steve Kerr has also spoken out against the AAU, stating that the AAU's structure devalues winning, with many teams playing as much as four times a day and some players changing teams  from one morning to the afternoon of the same day. Kerr also states that "The process of growing as a team basketball player — learning how to become part of a whole, how to fit into something bigger than oneself — becomes completely lost within the AAU fabric".

Sexual misconduct allegations have come to light several times during the 21st century.  Former President Robert W. "Bobby" Dodd was accused of abuse in 2011. Then in 2016, the AAU was sued for allowing Rick Butler, a youth volleyball coach accused of sexually abusing his players in the past, to coach an under-18 team in the AAU Girls' Junior National Volleyball Championships.

References

External links

 
1888 establishments in the United States
Lake Buena Vista, Florida
Organizations based in Florida
Sports organizations established in 1888